The Institute of Physicochemistry of Materials, Environment and Energy (INQUIMAE) is a chemistry research centre with double dependence shared among the University of Buenos Aires (UBA) and Argentina's national research council CONICET. It is located at the Faculty of Exact and Natural Sciences Pabellón II building, in the Ciudad Universitaria complex.

Purpose 
Promote basic and applied quality research in the areas or inorganic chemistry, materials, analytics and physical chemistry. Contributing thus to technological development, from its fundamental aspects up to their implementation, while focusing on local, national and regional relevance issues.

History 
Created in 1992 as an institute of the Universidad de Buenos Aires, in 1995 it became also a CONICET institute.

Its first director was Dr. Roberto Fernández Prini along with Dr. José  Antonio Olabe as vicedirector. In May 2008 Dr. Ernesto J. Calvo became director after a public competition for the position. Dr. Darío Estrin is the current director.

In 2007 the seminaries classroom was named Roberto Fernández Prini to honor its founding director.

Research areas 
 Bioinorganics, Bioanalytics y Biophysical chemistry
 Coordination compounds
 Energy
 Materials
 Environment
 Environmental chemistry
 Sensors and devices
 Surfaces and interfaces

References

External links 
 
 INQUIMAE Facebook
 INQUIMAE Instagram
 INQUIMAE Twitter

Research institutes in Argentina
University of Buenos Aires
Scientific organisations based in Argentina
1992 establishments in Argentina